Marcus Vergette MRSS (born 1961) is an American sculptor based in the UK, much of whose recent work involves bells. He is also  a double bass player and composer.

Early life and education
Vergette was born in Carbondale, Illinois. He studied at Portsmouth School of Art, Southern Illinois University and Central School of Art, London (1981-1983).

Time and Tide Bells

Vergette's Time and Tide Bells project comprises bells which are hung on the UK coast and are rung by the action of the sea at high tide. The first was installed at Appledore, Devon in 2009, the sixth at Morecambe, Lancashire in 2019, and  further installations are planned.

Other works
Vergette's first bell was created as a community project in his local village of Highampton, where he has a small farm, to celebrate the ending of the Foot and Mouth Disease epidemic of 2001, and to commemorate the animals slaughtered.

His Listening Bell (2006) is on the campus of the University of Leicester and his Harmonic Cannon or Canon(2017) stands in the courtyard of Trinity Laban in Greenwich.

References

External links

Living people
British sculptors
1961 births